Piñata Protest is an American punk rock band from San Antonio, Texas. The band is noted for their amalgamation of Tex-Mex and punk music with lyrics both in Spanish and English.

Biography 
In 2006, Lead singer and accordionist Alvaro Del Norte originally formed Piñata Protest with three other musicians, guitarist Manuel Garcia, drummer Victor Luna, and bassist Elliot Ramirez, all of whom have since left the band.

In 2010, debut EP Plethora was released.

In March 2012, Piñata Protest first performed at SXSW and have appeared multiple times since

In 2013, NPR Music referred to Piñata Protest's EP El Valiente as "the ultimate lesson of El Valiente: that the combination of accordions and punk represents an organic expression of the bicultural life lived by millions across this country".

In May 2015, NPR's Alt.Latino said of Piñata Protest, "We are big fan of the band".

In late October 2016, Piñata Protest went into the studio with producer Dave Irish to record at Pot O' Gold Recording in Orange, CA.  Their brand new EP, titled “Cuatro Exitos”, will be released in May 2017 and will serve as a follow up to "El Valiente."

Influences 
Source:
 Punk rock influences come from bands such as Ramones, Nirvana, Los Crudos.
 Tex-Mex, or Norteño influences come from bands such as Los Tigres del Norte, Texas Tornados.

Discography

Singles & EPs 
 Plethora (2010)
 Plethora "Reloaded" (2012)
 El Valiente (2013)
 Cuatro Exitos (2017)
 Necio Nights (2018)

Albums

Current members 
 Alvaro Del Norte: Squeezebox, Vocals, Pocket trumpet
 Chris-Ruptive: Drums
 Richie Brown: Bass, vocals
 Regino Lopez: Guitar, vocals

Past members 
 Jose Morales
 Manuel Garcia
 Omar Nambo
 Elliott Ramirez
 Victor Luna
 Marcus Cazares

References

External links 
 Piñata Protest Official Website
 Piñata Protest on Facebook

American norteño musicians
Tejano accordionists
Musical groups established in 2006
Latin music groups
Musical groups from San Antonio
Punk rock groups from Texas